Carpenterella is a genus erected for a species of chytrid fungus, Carpenterella molinea, that inhabits the deep vascular xylem tissues of the Moline variety of the American elm tree, causing disease. The genus name recognizes American plant pathologist Clarence Willard Carpenter (1888-1946), who described a similar fungus in relation to chlorotic streak disease of sugar cane in Hawaii.

References

Chytridiomycota genera
Taxa described in 1941
Parasitic fungi